The year 2011 is the 23rd year in the history of Shooto, a mixed martial arts promotion based in Japan. In 2011 Shooto held 22 events beginning with, Shooto: Shootor's Legacy 1.

Title fights

Events list

Shooto: Shootor's Legacy 1

Shooto: Shootor's Legacy 1 was an event held on January 10, 2011, at Korakuen Hall in Tokyo, Japan.

Results

Shooto: Shooting Disco 14: 365-Step March

Shooto: Shooting Disco 14: 365-Step March was an event held on February 26, 2011, at Shinjuku Face in Tokyo, Japan.

Results

Shooto: Genesis

Shooto: Genesis was an event held on March 21, 2011, at Kokurakita Gym in Kitakyushu, Fukuoka, Japan.

Results

Shooto: Shootor's Legacy 2

Shooto: Shootor's Legacy 2 was an event held on April 1, 2011, at Shinjuku Face in Tokyo, Japan.

Results

Shooto: Border: Season 3: Spring Thunder

Shooto: Border: Season 3: Spring Thunder was an event held on April 3, 2011, at Hirano Ward Community Hall in Osaka, Kansai, Japan.

Results

Shooto: Gig Saitama 3

Shooto: Gig Saitama 3 was an event held on April 10, 2011, at Fujimi Cultural Center in Fujimi, Saitama, Japan.

Results

Shooto: Gig Central 22

Shooto: Gig Central 22 was an event held on April 17, 2011, at Asunal Kanayama Hall in Nagoya, Aichi, Japan.

Results

Shooto: Shooto Tradition 2011

Shooto: Shooto Tradition 2011 was an event held on April 29, 2011, at Tokyo Dome City Hall in Tokyo, Japan.

Results

Shooto: Gig Tokyo 6

Shooto: Gig Tokyo 6 was an event held on May 28, 2011, at Shinjuku Face in Tokyo, Japan.

Results

Shooto: Gig West 13

Shooto: Gig West 13 was an event held on June 5, 2011, at Abeno Ward Hall in Osaka, Kansai, Japan.

Results

Shooto: Shooting Disco 15: Try Hard, Japan!

Shooto: Shooting Disco 15: Try Hard, Japan! was an event held on June 11, 2011, at Shinjuku Face in Tokyo, Japan.

Results

Shooto: Shootor's Legacy 3

Shooto: Shootor's Legacy 3 was an event held on July 18, 2011, at Korakuen Hall in Tokyo, Japan.

Results

Shooto: Gig Tokyo 7

Shooto: Gig Tokyo 7 was an event held on August 6, 2011, at Shinjuku Face in Tokyo, Japan.

Results

Shooto: Border: Season 3: Roaring Thunder

Shooto: Border: Season 3: Roaring Thunder was an event held on September 4, 2011, at Hirano Ward Community Hall in Osaka, Kansai, Japan.

Results

Shooto: Shootor's Legacy 4

Shooto: Shootor's Legacy 4 was an event held on September 23, 2011, at Korakuen Hall in Tokyo, Japan.

Results

Shooto: Shooting Disco 16: Regeneration

Shooto: Shooting Disco 16: Regeneration was an event held on October 1, 2011, at Shinjuku Face in Tokyo, Japan.

Results

Shooto: Gig Central 23

Shooto: Gig Central 23 was an event held on October 2, 2011, at Asunal Kanayama Hall in Nagoya, Aichi, Japan.

Results

Shooto: Gig North 7

Shooto: Gig North 7 was an event held on October 16, 2011, at Zepp Sapporo in Sapporo, Hokkaido, Japan.

Results

Shooto: Shooto the Shoot 2011

Shooto: Shooto the Shoot 2011 was an event held on November 5, 2011, at Tokyo Dome City Hall in Tokyo, Japan.

Results

Shoot Boxing / Rise / Sustain: SRS 2011 for Japan

Shoot Boxing / Rise / Sustain: SRS 2011 for Japan was an event held on November 11, 2011, at Korakuen Hall in Tokyo, Japan.

Results

Shooto: Spirit Aomori

Shooto: Spirit Aomori was an event held on November 27, 2011, at Aomori Prefectural Budokan in Hirosaki, Aomori, Japan.

Results

Shooto: The Rookie Tournament 2011 Final

Shooto: The Rookie Tournament 2011 Final was an event held on December 18, 2011, at Shinjuku Face in Tokyo, Japan.

Results

See also 
 List of Shooto champions
 List of Shooto Events

References

Shooto events
2011 in mixed martial arts